Harry Soref (1887–1957) was an American locksmith and businessman.  He was the founder of the Master Lock company.

Soref was born in Russian Empire (Bilozirka, Ternopil Oblast, Ukraine), and immigrated to the United States.  In 1921, he founded the Master Lock company in Milwaukee, Wisconsin.  The company built locks based on Soref's designs using laminated steel to build strong yet inexpensive locks; he received over 80 patents for his designs.

Soref and his wife Bertha had five children.  He died in Phoenix, Arizona, at the age of 70.

References

American manufacturing businesspeople
Locksmiths
1887 births
1957 deaths
Russian and Soviet emigrants to the United States
19th-century American inventors
People from Ternopil Oblast
Businesspeople from Milwaukee